Isahara is a town and commune in Madagascar. It belongs to the district of Vangaindrano, which is a part of Atsimo-Atsinanana Region. The population of the commune was estimated to be approximately 10,000 according to the 2001 commune census.

Only primary schooling is available. About 99% of the population of the commune are farmers. The most important crop is rice, while other important products are sugarcane, cassava and sweet potatoes. Additionally, fishing employs 1% of the population.

References and notes 

Populated places in Atsimo-Atsinanana